Roy Alan Lynes (born 25 October 1943, Redhill, Surrey) is an English musician and occasional singer, who was the keyboardist for the rock band Status Quo (originally The Spectres then Traffic Jam). He joined the band in 1964/1965, two years after its foundation.

He appeared on Quo's first three albums – Picturesque Matchstickable Messages from the Status Quo, Spare Parts and Ma Kelly's Greasy Spoon – and wrote "To Be Free", the b-side of the second Quo single, "Black Veils of Melancholy". The track "Umleitung" was a co-composition with bassist Alan Lancaster, but was not released until the first album after Lynes' departure, 1971's Dog of Two Head. 

Lynes left the band in 1970, and was eventually replaced by Andy Bown in 1977. "We were frightened out of our lives to play without him," recalled Lancaster, "because the organ had always drowned out the bad bits."

According to the group's producer John Schroeder, who wrote the booklet notes for the 3-CD compilation The Early Years, Lynes was 'the quietest member of the group' and 'somehow always seemed to be the odd one out'.  He had fallen in love on tour, claiming he could see how serious the other band members (Lancaster, Francis Rossi, Rick Parfitt and John Coghlan) were about fame and glory, and that he just wanted to settle down to a life with his newfound love. "I was shocked, but Roy was like that," recalled Rossi in 2001. "He'd met a bird in some petrol station a week earlier, and they're still married today."

In the group's autobiography Just for the Record (1993), Parfitt said Lynes was 'a bit laid back, the Open University type who liked tinkering and finding out about things,' and Rossi remarked that he showed up at a gig in New Zealand about ten years later to say hello; 'He seemed a much happier bloke.'

He is still active in Australia and has continued to perform in his own right. On Status Quo's 2000 tour of Australia, Lynes contributed to keyboards with them onstage in Brisbane. Lynes has also occasionally contributed keyboards and vocals to Australian tribute band Statoz Quo.

References

1943 births
Living people
Status Quo (band) members
English rock keyboardists
People from Redhill, Surrey